Lago di Cama (or "Lagh de Cama") is a lake in the Cama valley, a side valley of Val Mesolcina in the Grisons, Switzerland.

See also
List of mountain lakes of Switzerland

References

Lakes of Switzerland
Lakes of Graubünden
Cama, Switzerland